Marcus Annius Verus (died 124 AD) was a distinguished Roman politician who lived in the 2nd century, served as a praetor and was the father of the Emperor Marcus Aurelius.

Life
He was the son of Roman senator Marcus Annius Verus and noblewoman Rupilia Faustina. His brother was the consul Marcus Annius Libo and his sister was Faustina the Elder, wife of Antoninus Pius. He married Domitia Lucilla, the heiress of a wealthy family which owned a tile factory. They had two children, Marcus Aurelius (born in 121, and who was also originally named Marcus Annius Verus), and Annia Cornificia Faustina (born in 123). Annius Verus died young while he held the office of praetor. Both his children were still young. The likeliest year of his death is 124.

In his Meditations, Marcus Aurelius, who was only about 3 years old when his father died, says of him: "From what I heard of my father and my memory of him, modesty and manliness."

References

2nd-century Romans
124 deaths
Annii
Nerva–Antonine dynasty
Imperial Roman praetors
Date of birth unknown